Jan van Balkum (29 February 1888 – 17 May 1978) was a Dutch sports shooter. He competed in the 25 m rapid fire pistol event at the 1924 Summer Olympics.

References

External links
 

1888 births
1978 deaths
Dutch male sport shooters
Olympic shooters of the Netherlands
Shooters at the 1924 Summer Olympics
People from Maasdriel
Sportspeople from Gelderland